The Joker: Devil's Advocate is an American  one-shot superhero comic book written by Chuck Dixon and drawn by Graham Nolan, published by DC Comics in 1996.<ref name="advocate">The Joker: Devil's Advocate – The Big Database of Comic Books]</ref> Several recurring characters of the Batman family appear in the story, such as Robin, James Gordon, Barbara Gordon, and Alfred Pennyworth.

Synopsis
The post office puts out a new set of postage stamps commemorating famous comedians, but some of the sets have Joker Venom on the back; people who lick them die grinning. The Joker, who's angry about not having his own stamp, takes hostages at the post office, and is captured by Batman. The DA decides to try Joker for murder, and he's found guilty and sentenced to death. Batman, however, believes that Joker wasn't the one who poisoned the stamps, and he sets out to find the real killer, even though doing so would save the Joker's life.

Characters
Batman
Robin
The Joker
James Gordon
Alfred Pennyworth
Barbara Gordon
Harvey Bullock
Renee Montoya
Billy Pettit
Sarah Essen-Gordon
Stan Kitch

References

External links
 Review of The Joker: Devil's Advocate at IGN
 [https://readcomiconline.to/Comic/The-Joker-Devil-s-Advocate The Joker: Devil's Advocate'' at ReadComicOnline.to